Baccaurea hookeri is a species of plant in the family Phyllanthaceae. It is found in Malaysia and Singapore.

References

hookeri
Conservation dependent plants
Taxonomy articles created by Polbot